The FIS Alpine World Ski Championships 2013 were the 42nd FIS Alpine World Ski Championships, held 4–17 February in Austria at Planai in Schladming, Styria. A record number of athletes and countries took part in this championships. Schladming previously hosted the 1982 World Championships, and prior to acquiring the 2013 event, it made two unsuccessful bids to host.

The FIS awarded the 2013 championships to Schladming on 29 May 2008, in Cape Town, South Africa. The other three finalists were Beaver Creek in Vail, United States, Cortina d'Ampezzo, Italy, and St. Moritz, Switzerland. Beaver Creek/Vail hosted in 2015 and St. Moritz gained the championships for 2017.

Course information

Medal winners

Men's events

Women's events

Team event

Medal table

Participating nations
614 athletes from 72 countries competed. Malta made its debut appearance.

  (1)
  (6)
  (10)
  (5)
  (10)
  (37)
  (1)
  (4)
  (12)
  (8)
  (2)
  (6)
  (20)
  (13)
  (6)
  (18)
  (4)
  (12)
  (10)
  (1)
  (9)
  (34)
  (5)
  (20)
  (2)
  (8)
  (2)
  (18)
  (10)
  (4)
  (12)
  (3)
  (4)
  (24)
  (1)
  (7)
  (5)
  (7)
  (13)
  (9)
  (8)
  (4)
  (3)
  (5)
  (1)
  (1)
  (2)
  (2)
  (5)
  (7)
  (9)
  (10)
  (8)
  (2)
  (2)
  (1)
  (1)
  (17)
  (4)
  (8)
  (11)
  (22)
  (4)
  (1)
  (4)
  (15)
  (30)
  (2)
  (7)
  (20)
  (1)
  (11)

Injuries
On 5 February 2013, during the super-G, American Lindsey Vonn was involved in a severe crash and was airlifted to a nearby hospital. Vonn tore her anterior cruciate ligament and medial collateral ligament in her right knee and fractured her right tibia.

References

External links
  
 FIS-Ski.com – AWSC 2013 – calendar & results
 Coin issued by the Austrian Mint to commemorate the event

 
2013 in alpine skiing
2013
International sports competitions hosted by Austria
FIS Alpine World Ski Championships
Sport in Styria
Qualification events for the 2014 Winter Olympics
Alpine skiing competitions in Austria
February 2013 sports events in Europe